Adani Green Energy Limited (AGEL) is an Indian renewable energy company headquartered in Ahmedabad, Gujarat. It is owned by Indian conglomerate Adani Group. The company operates Kamuthi Solar Power Project, one of the largest solar photovoltaic plants in the world.

History 

The company was incorporated on 23 January 2016, as Adani Green Energy Limited under the Companies Act 2013.

During the initial days of existence, AGEL and Inox Wind together established a 20 MW capacity wind power project in Lahori, Madhya Pradesh. Also, AGEL bought Inox Wind's 50 MW wind power project at Dayapar village in Kutch. The project was conceived by the latter when it won a Solar Energy Corporation of India's capacity bids for wind power projects connected to the National Grid.

In 2015–2016, Adani Renewable Energy Park Limited, a subsidiary of AGEL, signed a joint venture agreement with the Government of Rajasthan.

In 2017, the company took the complete control of overall solar energy portfolio of Adani Enterprises and got itself listed at National Stock Exchange of India and Bombay Stock Exchange.

In 2022, Adani Green Energy Limited had a market cap of Rs. 3,26,635.42 crore.

Operations 

Currently, the company manages 5,290 MW of wind energy and solar power plants including 46 operational projects in 11 states of India namely Uttar Pradesh, Rajasthan, Punjab, Maharashtra, Gujarat, Madhya Pradesh, Chhattisgarh, Andhra Pradesh, Karnataka, Tamil Nadu, and Telangana. AGEL has a current project portfolio of ~5.29 GW and an operational capacity of ~2.32 GW.

As of 31 March 2019, AGEL has one joint venture and 39 subsidiaries.

In May 2020, AGEL won the world's largest solar bid worth $6 billion by the Solar Energy Corporation of India (SECI). The bid entails AGEL building an 8000 MW photovoltaic power plant.

In May 2021, AGEL confirmed its decision to buy SoftBank Group Corp backed SB Energy Holdings Limited for $3.5 billion.

Green bonds 
In late 2019, AGEL became the first Indian company to offer investment-grade US dollar green bonds worth US$362.5 million to foreign investors. The bonds got listed on Singapore Exchange Securities Trading Limited (SGX- ST) on 15 October 2019 and it will mature on the same date in 2039.

Acquisitions 
In March 2018, upon acquisition of 49 percent equity shares of Kodangal Solar Parks Private Limited, the latter became a joint venture of AGEL. In 2019, AGEL acquired the rest 51 percent equity share as well.

In mid-2019, AGEL acquired Essel Group's solar power portfolio of 205MW located in Punjab, Karnataka and Uttar Pradesh  for US$185 million (approx. ₹1,300 crores). AGEL has also agreed to buy out the remaining 480MW solar energy portfolio of the former which are under construction.

In early 2020, French energy company Total S.A. entered into a binding agreement with AGEL for the investment of US$510 million to acquire a 20% stake in the latter.

Controversies

Rajasthan Solar Park 
Local farmers have opposed to construction of 1.5GW solar park at Pokhran after which High Court of Rajasthan has ordered status quo.

Allegations of stock manipulation 
In January 2023, Hindenburg Research published the findings of a two-year investigation claiming that Adani had engaged in market manipulation and accounting malpractices; Hindenburg also disclosed that it was holding short positions on Adani Group companies. Bonds and shares of companies associated with Adani experienced a decline in value after the accusations. Adani denied the fraud allegations as unfounded and ill intentioned.

See also 

 Renewable energy in India
 Solar power in India
 Wind power in India

References

External links
 

 

Adani Group
Companies based in Ahmedabad
 
Solar energy companies of India
 
Utilities of India
Energy in Gujarat
Energy companies established in 2015
Indian companies established in 2015
2015 establishments in Gujarat
Companies listed on the National Stock Exchange of India
Companies listed on the Bombay Stock Exchange